Ramanand Baudh is an Indian politician and a member of 17th Legislative Assembly of Kushinagar in the Indian state of Uttar Pradesh. He represents the Ramkola constituency of Uttar Pradesh and is a member of the Suheldev Bharatiya Samaj Party.

Political career
As of 2017 Baudh was a member of the 17th Legislative Assembly of Uttar Pradesh, representing the Ramkola constituency as a member of the Suheldev Bharatiya Samaj Party. He defeated Samajwadi Party candidate Purnmasi Dehati by a margin of 55,729 votes.

Posts held

See also
Uttar Pradesh Legislative Assembly

References

Uttar Pradesh MLAs 2017–2022
Suheldev Bhartiya Samaj Party politicians
Living people
1964 births